Little Tobago (or Bird of Paradise Island) is a small island off the northeastern coast of Tobago, and part of the Republic of Trinidad and Tobago.

The island supports dry forest.  It is an important breeding site for seabirds such as red-billed tropicbird, Audubon's shearwater, brown booby, brown noddy, sooty and bridled terns. A few pairs of white-tailed tropicbirds are also nesting here.

Little Tobago is also a good site from which to see birds which breed on neighbouring small islands, including red-footed booby and magnificent frigatebird. The latter species is frequently seen harassing the tropicbirds, boobies and terns.

A few species of reptiles have been recorded on Little Tobago. Among them are lizards such as Green Iguanas, Ameiva atrigularis, Rainbow whiptails, Antilles leaf-toed geckos, Turnip-tailed geckos, Ocellated geckos (Gonatodes ocellatus), Mole's geckos (Sphaerodactylus molei), Allen's bachias (Bachia heteropa alleni), and snakes including Boddaert's tropical racers (Mastigodryas boddaerti) and Oliver's parrot snakes (Leptophis coeruleodorsus).

Among the more conspicuous of the invertebrate fauna on the island are large terrestrial hermit crabs.

The sea between Tobago and Little Tobago is shallow, and glass-bottomed boats enable the attractive corals and brightly coloured tropical fish to be seen on the crossing. It is a popular area for snorkelling and diving, especially on Angel Reef in front of Goat Island.

History
In 1908 the British politician and businessman Sir William Ingram purchased Little Tobago in order to turn it into a bird sanctuary. The next year he introduced the greater bird of paradise (Paradisaea apoda) to the island in an attempt to save the species from overhunting for the plume trade in its native New Guinea. The bird's plumage was particularly fashionable in women's hats. Forty-seven juvenile birds were introduced to the island, having been transported on a German ocean liner.

After Ingram's death in 1924 his heirs deeded the island to the Government of Trinidad and Tobago as a wildlife sanctuary.  The birds survived on the island until at least 1958 when they were filmed by a National Geographic crew.  There are no reliable records after 1963 when Hurricane Flora hit the island and the population is presumed to be extinct.

See also
 Islands of Trinidad and Tobago

References

 Boodram, Natalie. 2001. The ecology of plant species on Little Tobago, Tobago, W.I. M.Phil. Thesis, University of the West Indies, St. Augustine.

Geography of Tobago
Uninhabited islands of Trinidad and Tobago